Gabriela Basterra is a professor of Comparative Literature and Spanish at New York University. She is primarily known for her work on philosophy and literature, ethical subjectivity, rhetoric, poetry, tragedy, psychoanalysis, ethics and politics.

Life and work
Basterra received her Ph.D. in Romance Languages and Literatures from Harvard University in 1997, and has taught at NYU ever since. She has also been a visiting professor at Princeton University. Between 2004-10 Professor Basterra held the position of Directeur de Programme at the Collège International de Philosophie in Paris.

Seminars
Basterra has contributed to major conferences and events on Kant, Emmanuel Levinas, Paul Ricoeur, Ernesto Laclau, political subjectivity and rhetoric, and her lectures have been broadcast on Radio France Culture  
Her program "Autonomie Tragique: Interaction entre le politique et l'éthique", at the Collège International de Philosophie included her seminars "La mort tragique comme évasion" (2005), "Éthiques du brisement" (2006), “Brisement éthique, désir du politique” (2007), “Se faire signe” (2008), “Poétique du laps” (2009) and “Être inspiré” (2010).

Books and publications
Gabriela Basterra is the author of two books, Seductions of Fate: Tragic Subjectivity, Ethics, Politics (2004)  and The Subject of Freedom: Kant, Levinas (2015) .  She has co-edited Quel sujet du politique? (2010), a monographic issue of the Collège International de Philosophie journal Rue Descartes, and is working on two book projects – Shaping the Void: Vessels, Concepts, Poems and Ethical and Poetic Address – and on a collection of her French essays, Hétéronomies.

Her recent articles include "I Love to Hate my Life or the Allure of Guilt" (2004), "El respeto como evasión" (2005), "Résister aux sirènes de l'impuissance" (2006), “Ethics, Perhaps” (2007), "Activité au-delà de toute activité" (2007), “Choreography of Fate: Lorca’s Reconfigurations of the Tragic” (2008), “Does Creativity Deny Itself?” (2009), “Auto-Heteronomy or Levinas’s Philosophy of the Same” (2010), "Subjectivité inouïe” (2010), "Subjectivity at the Limit: Velázquez, Kant, Levinas" (2012), "Reason's Other in Quotation Marks: Nietzsche on Tragedy and Doubling" (2013), and "Unconditioned Subjectivity: Immanent Synthesis in Kant's Third Antinomy" (2015).

Footnotes

External links
Faculty Profile, Department of Comparative Literature, NYU
Seductions of Fate
The Subject of Freedom 
I Love to Hate my Life or the Allure of Guilt: A Response to Simon Critchley
Rue Descartes

Living people
New York University faculty
Educators from New York City
American women educators
Harvard Graduate School of Arts and Sciences alumni
Year of birth missing (living people)
Princeton University faculty
21st-century American women